Texico is the name of some places in the United States:

Texico, Illinois
Texico, New Mexico
"Texico Bitches", a song from Broken Social Scene's 2010 album Forgiveness Rock Record

See also
Texaco
The Texican